"I Should Be So Lucky" is a 1987 song performed by Australian recording artist and songwriter Kylie Minogue from her debut studio album Kylie (1988). Released on 29 December 1987 by Mushroom Records and PWL Records, the song became a worldwide breakthrough hit; its image of Minogue on the front cover was shot by David Levine. The song was written and produced by Stock Aitken Waterman for Minogue, and they went on to produce Minogue's first four studio albums.

The song received positive reviews from contemporary music critics, although some dismissed the lyrical content. Despite this, it received commercial attention around the world, topping charts in countries such as the United Kingdom, Australia, and Germany, and peaked in the top ten in countries including New Zealand and Japan, and on the Dance charts in the U.S.

British magazine Classic Pop ranked it number 11 in their list of "Top 40 Stock Aitken Waterman songs" in 2021.

Recording and development
After the success of her debut single "Locomotion" in Australia, Minogue traveled to London to work with Stock Aitken Waterman, a successful British writing and production team. They knew little of Minogue and had forgotten that she was arriving; as a result, they wrote "I Should Be So Lucky" in forty minutes while she waited outside the recording studio. Mike Stock wrote the lyrics for the song in response to what he had learned about Minogue prior to her arrival. He believed that although she was a successful soap star in Australia and very talented, there must be something wrong with her and figured that she must be unlucky in love. Minogue recorded the song in less than an hour, which Stock attributes to her good ear for music and her quick memorization skills. However, she left the studio angry, not knowing what the song sounded like after she was fed it to sing line by line.

After Minogue finished the recording session, she returned home to Australia to continue work on the soap opera, Neighbours. The track was then shelved and forgotten about by the producers, and was only mixed and completed after threats by Mushroom Records general manager Gary Ashley to fly to the UK. Stock later told The Guardian: "We had to get the song together in about 40 minutes and she left not having had a happy experience. We didn’t know we had a hit on our hands and so when it went to No 1 for five weeks, someone said: 'What’s the follow-up?' We didn't have one. So I went out to Australia at the start of 1988 and met her in a bar with Jason and her manager. I basically crawled 100 yards on my knees and apologised profusely."

Composition
"I Should Be So Lucky" is a pop and hi-NRG song which features elements of bubblegum pop and new wave music. According to the music sheet on MusicNotes.com, which was published by Universal Music Publishing Group, the song is set in the key of C major. Minogue's vocals span from D4 to C5.  The song is set in common time and moves at a moderate tempo of 116 beats per minute. Instrumentation of the song features synthesizers, keyboards and guitars. According to PopMatters, the song features "numerous orchestra hits to the uncomfortably thin sounding drum machine." Waterman has said the tune was inspired by Pachelbel's Canon, a claim that has been refuted by Stock and Aitken. Stock told The Guardian: "Anyone who thinks 'I Should Be So Lucky' is easy should try to play it. It's in four keys, all of them really awkward, and you can't even strum it unless you're a really good musician."

Critical reception

"I Should Be So Lucky" garnered positive reviews from some music critics. Nick Levine, from Digital Spy, called it "standout track". Chris True from AllMusic had reviewed the album, and highlighted the song as an album standout. But as a separate rating, they gave the single three stars out of five. In the review of The Best of Kylie Minogue (2012), Tim Sendra highlighted it as an album standout. Hunter Felt from PopMatters gave it a positive review, stating "something about Kylie’s innocent yet forceful vocals and the sheer catchiness of the song itself [...] So the song became a beloved secret, and I never bothered to try to tune my friends in on "I Could Be So Lucky", or, crazier yet, proclaim that this "has-been" would be a critical and commercial darling in a few years time." However, he did say the song was cliché. However, Mark Edwards from Stylus Magazine gave it a scathing remark by saying "Listening to the first tracks on Ultimate Kylie, you want to skip straight through, because early songs like "I Should Be So Lucky" and "Locomotion" are unlistenable—horribly naff, squeaky songs" and criticized Stock, Aitken and Waterman songs they produced in the 80s by stating "[the songs] transport the listener back to a time when every single in the UK charts was either written by Stock, Aitken and Waterman or sung by an Aussie soap star, or both." OK! called the song a "classic".

The song was also known to many in the late 1980s and early 1990s as one of Minogue's signature songs, which many critics entering the song on their best track or worst track list. And additionally, in 2011, "I Should Be So Lucky" was added to the National Film and Sound Archive of Australia's Sounds of Australia registry. "I Should Be So Lucky" later appeared on seven of Kylie's hit compilations including Greatest Hits (1992), Ultimate Kylie (2004), and Step Back in Time: The Definitive Collection (2019). The song won the Highest Selling Single award at the 3rd annual ARIA Awards.

Commercial performance
"I Should Be So Lucky" was released in the UK on 29 December 1987, and in Australia on 1 February 1988. It was a commercial success, staying atop the Australian Kent Music Report chart for six consecutive weeks, and became her second number-one single in her home country, following Locomotion. The single was certified platinum by the Australian Recording Industry Association (ARIA) and ranked at number five on the year-end chart for 1988. In New Zealand, the song entered at number 15 on New Zealand Top 40 and peaked at number three on 27 March 1988, spending twelve weeks on the chart. "I Should Be So Lucky" entered at number 90 on the UK Singles Chart, climbing to number 54 the following week. Three weeks later it rose to number one, and remained at the top for five weeks. It spent seventeen weeks on the chart. It was certified gold by the British Phonographic Industry (BPI) for the shipment of 600,000 copies. The song was one of the best-selling singles of 1988, with estimated sales of over 675,000.

Elsewhere, "I Should Be So Lucky" peaked on both the Billboard Hot 100 and the Hot Dance Club Play. The song reached number 10 on the Hot Dance Club Songs chart on 4 June 1988 and number 28 on the Hot 100 on 16 July 1988. Across Europe, "I Should Be So Lucky" also topped the singles charts in Germany, Ireland, and Switzerland. It became a top-five hit in Austria, France, and Norway, as well as a top-thirty hit in Belgium, the Netherlands, and Sweden. It peaked at number one in Finland, Israel, and Hong Kong. The song was certified silver by the Syndicat National de l'Édition Phonographique (SNEP) and gold in Germany.

Music video
The music video for "I Should Be So Lucky" was directed by Chris Langman and filmed during November 1987 at Channel 7 Studios in Melbourne, Australia. The video features Minogue walking through her home, with scenes of her dancing in front of a colourful chalkboard background intercut throughout. It presented a cute, wholesome, young "girl-next-door" image of Minogue to the public, with scenes of her giggling and making funny faces to the camera.

Another version of the video was made for television promotion. This version of the video shows Kylie riding in a car through Sydney. In other parts of the video, she's in the park and passersby are waving to her as she walks by them. This video premiered in the UK on Christmas Day 1987 in a live broadcast from the British Telecom Tower (Christmas Morning With Noel Edmonds, BBC1).

The official version of "I Should Be So Lucky" featured in the music video has been released commercially through multiple VHS and DVD collections. Its most recent inclusion is on the companion DVD to her 2012 greatest hits album, The Best of Kylie Minogue. Outtakes from the music video were used in Kylie: The Videos.

Formats and track listings
These are the formats and track listings of major single releases of "I Should Be So Lucky".

 7" Single
 "I Should Be So Lucky" – 3:24
 "I Should Be So Lucky"  – 3:24

 12" Single
 "I Should Be So Lucky"  – 6:08
 "I Should Be So Lucky"  – 3:24

 12" (The Bicentennial Mix) Single
 "I Should Be So Lucky"  – 6:12
 "I Should Be So Lucky"  – 3:24

 North American 12" Single
 "I Should Be So Lucky"  – 6:00
 "I Should Be So Lucky"  – 6:10
 "I Should Be So Lucky"  – 3:24

 iTunes digital EP - Remixes
(Not available at time of original release. Released for the first time as part of iTunes PWL archive release in 2009.) 
 "I Should Be So Lucky" 
 "I Should Be So Lucky" 
 "I Should Be So Lucky" 
 "I Should Be So Lucky" 
 "I Should Be So Lucky" 
 "I Should Be So Lucky" 
 "I Should Be So Lucky" 

 Other official versions
 "I Should Be So Lucky/Dreams"

Live performances
Minogue performed the song on the following concert tours:
 Disco in Dream/The Hitman Roadshow
 Enjoy Yourself Tour (Extended Mix performed)
 Rhythm of Love Tour (Extended Mix performed)
 Let's Get to It Tour (Extended Mix performed)
 Intimate and Live Tour (Torch Version)
 On A Night Like This Tour
 KylieFever2002 (as a medley with "Dreams")
 Showgirl: The Greatest Hits Tour
 Showgirl: The Homecoming Tour
 KylieX2008 (added as an encore from 17 May performance in Bucharest)
 Aphrodite: Les Folies Tour (only in the Japanese performances)
 For You, for Me (Torch version)
 Kiss Me Once Tour (part of a medley)
 Kylie Summer 2015 Tour (shortened a cappella version)
 Summer 2019

The song was also performed on:
 An Audience with Kylie Minogue a 2001 TV special
 BBC Proms in the Park 2012 (The Abbey Road Sessions version)

Credits and personnel

Credits adapted from Kylie album liner notes.

 Kylie Minogue – vocals
 Dee Lewis – backing vocals
 Mae McKenna – backing vocals
 Mike Stock – backing vocals, keyboards
 Matt Aitken – guitars, keyboards
 A. Linn – drums
 Mark McGuire – engineering
 Pete Hammond – mixing
 Burni Adams – engineering
 Rick O’Neil – Mastering Engineer

Charts

Weekly charts

Year-end charts

Certifications and sales

See also

 List of best-selling singles of the 1980s in the United Kingdom
 List of Melody Maker number-one singles of the 1980s
 List of UK charts and number-one singles (1969–1988)
 List of UK top-ten singles in 1988
 List of top 25 singles for 1988 in Australia
 List of European number-one hits of 1988
 List of number-one singles of 1988 (Finland)
 List of number-one hits of 1988 (Germany)
 List of number-one singles of 1988 (Ireland)
 List of number-one singles in Australia during the 1980s
 List of NME number-one singles of the 1980s
 List of UK Independent Singles Chart number ones of the 1980s
 List of UK Singles Chart number ones of the 1980s
 List of number-one singles of the 1980s (Switzerland)

References

Bibliography

External links
 "I Should Be So Lucky" at Kylie.com (archived from 2007)
 

Songs about luck
1987 singles
1988 singles
ARIA Award-winning songs
Hi-NRG songs
Songs written by Mike Stock (musician)
Songs written by Matt Aitken
Songs written by Pete Waterman
Kylie Minogue songs
Number-one singles in Australia
European Hot 100 Singles number-one singles
Number-one singles in Germany
Number-one singles in Israel
Irish Singles Chart number-one singles
UK Singles Chart number-one singles
UK Independent Singles Chart number-one singles
Number-one singles in Switzerland
Song recordings produced by Stock Aitken Waterman
1987 songs
Pete Waterman Entertainment singles
Mushroom Records singles
Festival Records singles